Bickenbach is a municipality in the Darmstadt-Dieburg district of Hesse, Germany. It is situated on the Hessische Bergstraße wine region.

Political geography

The federal state of Hesse is divided into three administrative regions (Regierungsbezirk); Bickenbach is located in the most southerly of these regions - Darmstadt. There are fourteen districts (landkreise) within this region; Bickenbach is located in the southern district of Darmstadt-Dieburg. The district surrounds the city of Darmstadt proper. Neighbouring districts include Offenbach to the north, Gross-Gerau to the west, Bergstrasse to the south-west and Odenwaldkreis to the south-east. To the east lies the district of Miltenberg which forms the border with the federal state of Bavaria.

Economy
The organic food supermarket chain Alnatura is headquartered in Bickenbach.

References

Darmstadt-Dieburg
Grand Duchy of Hesse